Jonny Stewart (born 20 February 1998) is an Irish professional rugby union player who currently plays for USRS.

He attended Wallace High School, Lisburn, before joining the Ulster Academy in 2016. He made his full Ulster debut against Leinster in October 2017.

In July 2019, Stewart graduated from the Queen's University of Belfast with an Upper Second Class Bachelor of Laws degree. In 2020, Stewart started his master's degree in Utrecht, where he started playing for the Utrechtse Studenten Rugby Society

References

External links
Ulster Rugby Profile
Ireland under-20 Profile

1998 births
Living people
Irish rugby union players
People educated at Wallace High School, Lisburn
Rugby union players from County Down
Rugby union scrum-halves
Ulster Rugby players